Françoise Choveaux (born in 1953) is a French composer and pianist.

Education 
Choveaux was trained at the Conservatoire de Lille, then at the École normale de musique de Paris, she continued her apprenticeship in the United States at the Peabody Institute of Baltimore, then at the Juilliard School of New York.

Career 
Choveaux has recorded the complete piano work of Darius Milhaud at the suggestion of Madeleine Milhaud, the composer's wife.

With close to 300 works to Choveaux's credit, she is part of this musical tradition, anchored until the 19th century, of the virtuoso instrumentalist and composer.

Selected discography 
 Darius Milhaud, complete piano work
 Françoise Choveaux, quintet with piano, quartets nº 1, 2, 3, 4  with the Vilnius String quartet and F. Choveaux as the pianist

References

External links 
 Françoise Chauvaux's personal website
 Françoise Chauvaux's orchestral works
 Françoise Choveaux's discography on Discogs
 Françoise Chauvaux on Ma vigne en musique

20th-century French women classical pianists
21st-century French women classical pianists
20th-century French composers
École Normale de Musique de Paris alumni
1953 births
Living people
20th-century women composers
Juilliard School alumni